Trepaneringsritualen is an industrial and dark ambient project created in 2008 by Swedish artist Thomas Martin Ekelund. He describes his style as "ritual music from Göta Länder"

Style and themes 

Pitchfork defined the project as "heavy ritual ambient" with "an almost psychedelic quality" Orlando Weekly described it as "an immersive experience with few equals in the world of experimental music, a pagan assault on all the senses"

The name Trepaneringsritualen is a reference to the surgical intervention in which a hole is drilled or scraped into the human skull known as trepanning.

Ekelund has referred to english punk rock band Crass as his most important influence for taught him "the importance of irreverence of form, and that music isn’t confined to the guitar-bass-drums paradigm".

Members 

 Thomas Martin Ekelund (2008-present)
 Peter Johan Nÿland (2017-present)

Discography

Studio albums
 Ritualer, Blot Och Botgöring (2008)
 Veil The World (2011)
 Deathward, To The Womb (2012)
 Deathstench / Trepaneringsritualen - Deathstench / Trepaneringsritualen (2013)
 Perfection & Permanence (2014)
 Trepaneringsritualen & Sutekh Hexen - One Hundred Year Storm (2014)
 T × R × P // Body Cargo - T × R × P // Body Cargo (2016)
 Kainskult (2017)
 Rituals (2017)
 Mz.412 / Trepaneringsritualen - X Post Industriale / Rituals 2015 e.v. (2017)
 Oberhausen Ritual - Live At Maschinenfest 2016 E.V.(2017)
 ᛉᛦ – Algir; Eller Algir I Merkstave (2019)

External links
 Official website
 Trepaneringsritualen at Bandcamp
Trepaneringsritualen discography at MusicBrainz
 Trepaneringsritualen discography at Discogs

See also 

List of dark ambient artists
List of ambient music artists

References 

Industrial musicians
Dark ambient musicians
2008 establishments in Sweden

Noise musicians
Swedish musicians
Audiovisual artists
Sound designers